A whist marker is a device for recording the current score in the game of whist.

Whist markers generally come in pairs, one for each couple.  Whist markers can be broadly divided into three groups:
 Short whist markers
 Long whist markers
 Long and short whist markers.

Short whist markers

A short whist marker displays the number of points gained so far in the game, and the number of games gained in the rubber.  Short whist overtook long whist  in popularity around the middle of the nineteenth century.

Five points win a game and three games win a rubber.  The points are for each trick over the book (the first six tricks) in a given deal, and in some games for "honours".

Thus a typical wooden whist marker has five broad flaps, for the points, and three narrow flaps for the number of games won so far.

Long whist markers
Long whist markers are similar, but the number of points in a game is ten, or in some cases a lesser number, greater than five.

Long and short whist markers
These devices are designed to allow scoring for either the long or short game, using the same marker (or pair of markers).

References

External links
 The Whist Marker Museum
 Gaming counters part 2 by Tony Hall at World of Playing Cards.

Whist